Beaver Creek Bridge, also known as FM 2326 Bridge at Beaver Creek or WC2215-02-002, is a historic bridge built during 1925-1926 near Electra in Wichita County, Texas.  It brings Farm-to-Market Road over Beaver Creek, connecting the Beaver Creek community with the Rock Crossing oilfield area in Wilbarger County.

It consists of three  riveted Warren pony truss spans and a concrete girder approach span, built to Texas Highway Department standard designs.  Its spans were fabricated by, and the bridge was built by, the Austin Bridge Company of Dallas, Texas.

It was listed on the National Register of Historic Places in 1996.  The bridge was then eligible for rehabilitation but not yet replacement.

See also

National Register of Historic Places listings in Wichita County, Texas
List of bridges on the National Register of Historic Places in Texas

References

Road bridges on the National Register of Historic Places in Texas
Bridges completed in 1926
Buildings and structures in Wichita County, Texas
Transportation in Wichita County, Texas
National Register of Historic Places in Wichita County, Texas
Warren truss bridges in the United States
1926 establishments in Texas